Puerto Esperanza Airport  is an airport serving the town of Esperanza in the Ucayali Region of Peru. The town is on the Purus River.

The Puerto Esperanza VOR (Ident: PZA) is located on the field.

See also

Transport in Peru
List of airports in Peru

References

External links
OpenStreetMap - Puerto Esperanza
OurAirports - Puerto Esperanza
SkyVector - Puerto Esperanza
Puerto Esperanza Airport

Airports in Peru
Buildings and structures in Ucayali Region